Pelobacter acidigallici is the type species in the bacterial genus Pelobacter.

P. acidigallici is able to degrade trihydroxybenzenes. The enzyme pyrogallol hydroxytransferase uses 1,2,3,5-tetrahydroxybenzene and 1,2,3-trihydroxybenzene (pyrogallol), whereas its two products are 1,3,5-trihydroxybenzene (phloroglucinol) and 1,2,3,5-tetrahydroxybenzene. This enzyme can be found in P. acidigallici.

References

External links
Type strain of Pelobacter acidigallici at BacDive -  the Bacterial Diversity Metadatabase

Pelobacteraceae
Bacteria described in 1983